Jean-Marie-Clément Badré was a French Catholic bishop of the twentieth century.
Born 17 Oct 1913 in Arbois,
 he was a son of Louis Badré, Inspector General of Water and Forests, and Mrs. Claire Maire and educated at Etudes: Lycée de Colmar, He was schooled at  Ecole Massillon, Lycée Saint-Louis and Séminaire de Saint-Sulpice in Paris.

On 23 December 1939, he was ordained as a deacon and then made a priest the next day (Christmas Eve 1939), shortly prior to the Nazi occupation of France. He asked for exceptional permission to be ordained a priest by Cardinal Verdier. During the war he and his brother Paul Badré with the resistance.
At this time he was Vicar at the parish of Saint-Antoine de Padoue and assistant chaplain of the Janson-de-Sailly high school in Paris.

After the war he was made Chaplain of the 1st military region (1945), Director of the Catholic military chaplaincy (1946), Catholic chaplain of the French armies,  Auxiliary of His Eminence Cardinal Feltin (Archbishop of Paris) (1964), Director of the Vicariate for the Armed Forces (1964)  then Vicar for the French Armies (1967),

In 1963 he was made Auxiliary Bishop of Paris, France  and Titular Bishop of Novae in Proconsular. He welcomed Pope John Paul II to the Basilica of Saint Therese of Lisieux during his apostolic visit to France in 1980.. On 19 Nov 1988, then aged 75, he retired as Bishop of Bayeux (-Lisieux), and 17 Sep 2001 aged 87 died. He was buried in the Bayeux Cathedral.

Decoration

 Officer of the Legion of Honor,  
 Croix de guerre 39-45, 
 Medal of the Resistance,  
 Commander of the Academic Palms.  
 Medal of the Health Service,  
 Canon of Honor of the Diocese of Paris,  
 Prelate of His Holiness.

References 

Bishops of Bayeux
1913 births
2001 deaths